Björn Jopek (born 24 August 1993) is a German professional footballer who plays as a midfielder for Kickers Offenbach. His father Bernd was also a footballer.

Career
In June 2018, Jopek left 3. Liga side Würzburger Kickers to join league rivals Hallescher FC.

On 1 February 2021, after training with Viktoria Berlin since August 2020, Jopek joined the Regionalliga Nordost club on a contract until summer 2022.

References

External links
 
 
 

1993 births
Living people
Footballers from Berlin
German footballers
Association football midfielders
1. FC Union Berlin players
Arminia Bielefeld players
Chemnitzer FC players
Würzburger Kickers players
Hallescher FC players
FC Viktoria 1889 Berlin players
Kickers Offenbach players
2. Bundesliga players
3. Liga players
Regionalliga players